István Weimper (born 27 August 1953) is a retired Hungarian footballer who played as a centre forward.

External links

1953 births
Living people
Hungarian footballers
Association football forwards
Budapest Honvéd FC players
Dunaújváros FC players
FC Tatabánya players
Aris Thessaloniki F.C. players
Győri ETO FC players
Kazincbarcikai SC footballers
Hungary international footballers
Footballers from Budapest